Ogulapur is a village in Nalgonda district in Telangana, India. It falls under Atmakur mandal.

Schools
There is M.P.U.P School in the village.

References

Villages in Nalgonda district